100 Demons is an American metalcore band from Waterbury, Connecticut. Being fans of tattoos, the band derived their name from a book of traditional Japanese tattoo artwork by Horiyoshi III. The band usually incorporates their agnostic beliefs into their lyrics.  

After over a decade of playing in the Connecticut hardcore scene, Deathwish Inc. announced the signing of 100 Demons to a record contract in 2003. In a press release the label was quoted as saying "Today's 100 DEMONS encapsulate a viciousness and ravenous intensity that few could achieve." The band then found themselves at Planet Z Studios with producer Zeuss (Hatebreed, Shadows Fall) recording their self-titled album.

The video for the song "Repeat Process" was featured on Headbangers Ball.

In 2019, Pete Morcey announced his new folk-influenced side project entitled Murmur.

Members
Current
 Pete Morcey - vocals
 Rich Rosa - drums
 Collin Reilly - guitar
 Rick Brayall - guitar
 Nick August - bass

Former
 Bruce Lepage
 Tim Mead
 Jeremy Braddock

Discography

Music videos
 "Repeat Process" (2004)

References

External links
 Official Page

Metalcore musical groups from Connecticut
Hardcore punk groups from Connecticut
Heavy metal musical groups from Connecticut
Musical quintets
Musical groups established in 2000
Deathwish Inc. artists
Good Life Recordings artists